Jean Gaspard de Vence (6 April 1747 – 12 March 1808) was a French privateer, admiral and Maritime Prefect of Toulon.

Biography
In 1762 at age 15 he entered the merchant navy in Bayonne, sailed to Saint-Domingue and several years later became a captain. Transferred to the Royal Navy, served on a 74-gun battleship Protecteur, incidentally studying mathematics and navigation. Then returned to the merchant navy and in 1767 aboard the ship Auguste take a cruise along the coast of Africa, near Cape St. Philip was in a shipwreck more than four months and get to Marseille, losing half the crew from scurvy.

Corsair and officer of the King during the American War
In 1776, he moved to Martinique, where at the beginning of the American War of Independence has received from Congress the right to privateering under the American flag. He served as captain of the xebec Victoire, on 17 May 1777 led by a 14-gun privateer Tigre, which took on board the 24-gun British merchant ship with a cargo valued at 500,000 pounds. Within 18 months, cruised in the West Indies, spent 40 fights and captured 211 prizes, earning a reputation as the most formidable privateer the Caribbean (British Parliament praised his head in the 2 million pounds). Following the announcement of Louis XVI war Britain returned to the king's service, took part in the Invasion of Dominica, where at the head of 400 buccaneers famous capture of Fort Cachacrou, for which a lieutenant and September 20, 1778 appointed commander of a privateer Truite. Under the command of Admiral d'Estaing Battle of St. Lucia, January 1, 1779 - Commander of the privateer «La Ceres». As a lieutenant 80-gun ship of the line «Le Languedoc», the flagship of Admiral d'Estaing distinguished himself at the capture of July 2, 1779 the island of Grenada, where the head 80 grenadiers attacked the British position and took the enemy's flag, for which he was awarded the rank of captain, participated in the Siege of Savannah. In this heroic period Jean-Charles de Borda coined the famous slogan "always in front of Vence!" (Vence toujours devance!). In 1780, he was appointed commander of the port of Grenada, but soon falsely accused of selling marine equipment and forced to resign. Upon returning home his ship was sunk by the British, and Captain de Vence got to Lisbon and Cadiz joined a volunteer for the combined Franco-Spanish fleet under the command of Admiral d'Estaing.

Admiral during the Revolution
At the beginning of the Revolution joined the National Guard of Paris under the command of the Marquis Lafayette, November 10, 1792 reinstated in the Navy with the rank of captain (old Charges withdrawn, and the cost reimbursed). He commanded a 74-gun battleship Duquesne and a small naval squadron, directed to the Levant and Tunisia for a cargo of wheat to starving France, then managed to overcome the British blockade and bring food to Toulon, where he headed the ship of the line Heureux. November 16, 1793 - Rear Admiral (approved by the rank September 2, 1794), served in Brest, accompanied the convoy from Bordeaux along the Atlantic coast to Lorient, but was attacked by a British fleet of Admiral William Cornwallis and forced to seek refuge at Belle Isle. From June 24 to December 8, 1795 - Commander of the Marine Division at Lorient in 1796 - deputy squadron commander Admiral Villaret-Joyeuse, opposed the expedition of General Lazare Hoche in Ireland. After the coup of Fructidor V-18 of the year was appointed Commander of Toulon arms, took an active part in preparing the fleet for the Egyptian expedition and provided logistical base in Italy, on the island of Malta and in Egypt, May 25, 1799 - Commander of Arms Rochefort. July 20, 1800 - Maritime Prefect of Toulon, was responsible for the formation of the squadron of Admiral Honoré Joseph Antoine Ganteaume, directed to the Barbary Coast and the squadron of Admiral Charles-Alexandre Léon Durand Linois, won a June 13, 1801 victory at the Battle of Algeciras. In 1802 - the commander of a squadron of Brest, then commanded the naval squadron Boulogne camp, September 30, 1803 he retired. Died March 11, 1808 in Tonnerre at the age of 61 years, buried in the cemetery of Saint-Pierre parish. Chevalier of St. Louis (January 24, 1780), a member of the Society of Cincinnati (1783).

References

 Dupuy/Hammerman, People & Events of the American Revolution, R.R. Bowker Company, 1974

External links
 Society of the Cincinnati
 American Revolution Institute

French privateers
French Navy admirals
French military personnel of the American Revolutionary War
Order of Saint Louis recipients
1747 births
1808 deaths
French Republican military leaders of the French Revolutionary Wars
French naval commanders of the Napoleonic Wars